Dyfed is a preserved county in southwestern Wales. It is a mostly rural area with a coastline on the Irish Sea and the Bristol Channel.

Between 1974 and 1996, Dyfed was also the name of the area's county council and the name remains in use for certain ceremonial and other purposes.

History
Dyfed is a preserved county of Wales. It was originally created as an administrative county council on 1 April 1974 under the terms of the Local Government Act 1972, and covered approximately the same geographic extent as the ancient Principality of Deheubarth, although excluding the Gower Peninsula and the area west of the River Tawe.

The choice of the name Dyfed was based on the historic name given to the region once settled by the Irish Déisi and today known as Pembrokeshire. The historic Dyfed never included Ceredigion and only briefly included Carmarthenshire. Modern Dyfed was formed from the administrative counties which corresponded to the ancient counties of Cardiganshire, Carmarthenshire and Pembrokeshire. The following day, it was divided into local government districts.

Dyfed County Council was abolished on 1 April 1996, when the three historic counties were reinstated for administrative purposes with Cardiganshire being renamed Ceredigion on the following day. The name "Dyfed" remains used for some ceremonial and administrative purposes.

Headquarters
The administrative headquarters of Dyfed County Council was Carmarthen, whilst the largest settlement was Llanelli. Other significant centres of population included Haverfordwest, Milford Haven and Aberystwyth.

Continued use of name
The name Dyfed was retained for such purely ceremonial purposes as the Lord Lieutenancy and in the name of some regional bodies such as Dyfed–Powys Police & Dyfed Telecom, but some databases, including that of Royal Mail, continued its use at least until 2008, causing confusion in online commerce.

Geography
Dyfed has a long coast on the Irish Sea to the west and the Bristol Channel to the south. It is bounded by the preserved counties of Gwynedd to the north, Powys to the east and West Glamorgan to the southeast.

Ceredigion, the northernmost part of Dyfed, has a narrow coastal strip and the Cambrian Mountains cover much of the east of the county. Further south in Ceredigion the land is less mountainous, and the River Teifi forms the border with Carmarthenshire for part of its length.

Carmarthenshire, the southeastern part of Dyfed, is mostly hilly, except for the river valleys and coastal strip. Fforest Fawr and Black Mountain extend into the east of Carmarthenshire and the Cambrian Mountains into the north. The highest point in Carmarthenshire is Fan Foel, on the border with Powys. The River Towy is the largest river and drains into the Bristol Channel, as do  the River Loughor, the River Gwendraeth and the River Taf. Carmarthenshire has a long coastline which is deeply cut by the estuaries of the Loughor, Gwendraeth, Tywi and Taf. The south coast has many fishing villages and sandy beaches and the eastern part around Llanelli and Burry Port is more industrial.

Pembrokeshire, the southwestern part of Dyfed, juts out into the Irish Sea and has a long, much indented, coastline. It does not have the mountains found in other parts of Dyfed but much of the interior is still hilly. In the north are the Preseli Hills (Mynydd Preseli), a wide stretch of high moorland. The largest river is the River Cleddau which has two main branches which join to form the Daugleddau estuary, which forms the important harbour of Milford Haven which enters the sea at the southwestern corner of the county. The areas around the River Cleddau are mainly level, low-lying land with many inlets and creeks. The coastline of Pembrokeshire has cliffs in places, and numerous bays and sandy beaches. The county contains the Pembrokeshire Coast National Park, which contains the 186-mile walking trail, the Pembrokeshire Coast Path.

See also
 1973 Dyfed County Council election
 1977 Dyfed County Council election
 List of Lord Lieutenants of Dyfed
 List of High Sheriffs of Dyfed

References 

 
Preserved counties of Wales